Sindhanai Sei is a 2009 Indian Tamil-language heist film written and directed by R. Yuvan in his directorial debut. The film stars R. Yuvan and Madhu Sharma, with Shafi, Nitish Veera, Shashank, Bala, Tharsha, and Ajay playing supporting roles. The film, produced by Ghilli Sekhar and Amma Rajasekhar, features a musical composed by S. Thaman (in his Tamil compositional debut) and was released on 31 July 2009. The film was also dubbed into Telugu as Bheebatsam.

Plot
The film starts with a flashback. The young man Aadhi (R. Yuvan) was disowned by his family and struggled to find a job in Chennai. He then fell in love with a rich girl named Gayathri (Madhu Sharma), and a month later, they got married, but later, Gayathri humiliated him and expelled him from her home because he was apathetic, poor, and could not satisfy her sexually. Aadhi then ran into his childhood friends Pazhani (Shashank) and Seenu (Bala) in a police station. Pazhani was a naïve bank employee who had an unpleasant tendency to talk for hours and drove away every person within his orbit, while the jobless Seenu stole money from bar customers to drink alcohol. They started to live together and decided to make easy money: they snatched gold chains and pickpocketed. Soon, they got fed up with small amounts and decided to rob a bank.

Back to the present, Aadhi and Seenu, both masked and armed, enter the bank, whereas the panic-stricken Pazhani ditches them. The two friends seize control of the bank and take the customers and employees hostage. Two of the hostages then put on their masks and shoot at Aadhi and Seenu. Police surround the bank and decide to catch the robbers, but the hostages are released at that moment. The police detain and question everyone but are unable to distinguish the identically dressed hostages from the robbers. The police find that the robbers' weapons were plastic replicas, and 5 crores were disappeared from the bank, but no clue was left.

A flashback reveals that Aadhi had roped two of his childhood friends Shankar (Shafi) and Hari (Nitish Veera), who were professional bank robbers. The five friends have successfully robbed 5 crores from the bank. Since the police are on their trail, they want to split and go to different towns by entrusting the job of carrying the entire money with a single man: Pazhani, who was not in the bank during the robbery. In the meantime, the police inspector (Ajay) is charged to arrest the culprits, and he finds that five people were involved in this robbery.

The five friends do not trust each other sufficiently. Shankar hires a man to steal the money bag from Pazhani, while Aadhi decides to secretly follow Pazhani in the bus. Aadhi then steals the money bag and runs away. When Pazhani tries to catch Aadhi, a container lorry hit Pazhani, and he died on the spot. A few days later, Aadhi returns to Seenu's home, and Seenu suspects Aadhi of double-crossing them. Aadhi has no other choice but to kill Seenu. Aadhi escapes from the crime scene and later meets with Shankar and Hari. They discover Seenu's dead body in his home and decide to bury it. Hari, who hates Shankar, suspects him of having the money bag and clashes with him, so he kidnaps Shankar's wife Dhanam (Tharsha) and sequesters her in a godown. Hari then realizes that Aadhi betrayed them and threatens to give him the money bag. Aadhi takes Hari to the woods and stones him to death. Aadhi then calls Shankar with Hari's phone and threatens him to kill his wife. Shankar arrives in the woods, and Aadhi cuts his throat.

With the help of a friend (Dhandapani), Aadhi fakes his own death and deposits the money in Gayathri's bank account. The next day, Aadhi meets Gayathri in her bedroom, has sex with her, and vanishes. The police inspector then arrests Gayathri and believes that Hari is still alive and was the one who killed his friends. Aadhi, delighted to have got revenge on his wife, leaves India to settle abroad. At the end, when Aadhi came to retrieve the money that he had hidden secretly, Dhanam hits Aadhi from behind (thinking that he was Hari) and dies.

Cast

R. Yuvan as Aadhi
Madhu Sharma as Gayathri
Shafi as Shankar
Nitish Veera as Hari
Shashank as Pazhani
Bala as Seenu
Tharsha as Dhanam
Ajay as Police Inspector
Mahanadi Shankar as Police Inspector
Annadurai Kannadasan as Bank Manager
Dhandapani as Aadhi's friend
Mayilsamy
Kottai Kumar
S. Thaman in a cameo appearance

Production

R. Yuvan (Prabhu Sekhar), brother of Telugu film choreographer cum director Amma Rajasekhar, made his directorial debut with Sindhanai Sei. He is the hero of the film and has done the story, screenplay, and dialogues as well. S. Thaman, a protégé of Mani Sharma, was chosen to compose the film's music, while R. Yuvan's brother Ghilli Sekhar was selected to be the fight choreographer. The film studies the psychology of five teenagers who meet later in life and has action and love but are depicted in a new way.

Soundtrack

The film score and the soundtrack were composed by S. Thaman.

The audio of the film was released on 9 November 2008 in Chennai, with Arjun Sarja being the chief guest of the function. Boopathy Pandian, Dharani, T. Siva, Venkat Prabhu, and A. M. Rathnam attended the audio function.

A critic rated the album 2 out of 5 and stated, "The music itself is rather dramatic, and sometimes strident. Almost all the songs, barring one seem to be pitched on the 6-kattai scale, which does not afford much variety in terms of listening".

Release
The film was released on 31 July 2009 alongside four other films.

Critical Reception

Upon release, the film gained mixed reviews. Pavithra Srinivasan of Rediff gave the film 3.5 out of 5 and called it a "must-watch". Bhama Devi Ravi of The Times Of India gave the film 3.5 out of 5 and said, "Having drafted a neat screenplay and a solid base for the story, the director never wavers [..] treats the film as a thriller meant to entertain, which is another whiff of freshness. Neat performances by all the actors is an added bonus". Sify said, "the movie begins with a promise but fails to maintain the momentum in the second half". A critic wrote, "Though, Sindhanai Sei seems to have been inspired from a long-list of flicks, Yuvan does a brilliant job in modifying them to the tastes of Tamil audiences". In contrast, Behindwoods.com rated the film 1 out of 5 and wrote, "Sindhanai Sei has turned out to be a movie which Yuvan tried to carry on his own shoulders. But, perhaps he burdened himself a bit too much". For the dubbed version, Idlebrain.com rated the film 1.5 out of 5 and stated, "First half of the film is uninteresting. Second half has interesting elements, but narration is unconvincing" and concluded with, "Bheebatsam disappoints and lives up to its title".

Box office
The film took an average opening at the Chennai box office.

References

External links

2009 films
2000s Tamil-language films
Indian action thriller films
Indian action drama films
Indian crime action films
Indian crime drama films
Indian crime thriller films
Indian heist films
Films shot in Chennai
Films set in Chennai
Films scored by Thaman S
2009 directorial debut films
2009 action drama films
2009 action thriller films
2000s crime action films
2009 crime drama films
2009 crime thriller films
2000s heist films